The 1982 Virginia National Bank 500 was a NASCAR Winston Cup Series racing event that was set on April 25, 1982, at Martinsville Speedway in Martinsville, Virginia. During the early 1980s, the NASCAR Winston Cup Series was plagued with top teams running big engines and finishing in third place to avoid inspection. 

By 1980, NASCAR had completely stopped tracking the year model of all the vehicles and most teams did not take stock cars to the track under their own power anymore. Only manual transmission vehicles were allowed to participate in this race; a policy that NASCAR has retained to the present day.

Background
Martinsville Speedway is one of five short tracks to hold NASCAR races. The track's turns are banked at eleven degrees, while the front stretch, the location of the finish line, is banked at zero degrees. The back stretch also has a zero degree banking.

Race report
A total starting grid of 31 drivers competed for three and a half hours in this 500-lap racing competition. D.K. Ulrich was involved in a crash on lap 14; leading to his last-place finish. An audience consisting of 36,500 live spectators eventually got to see Harry Gant defeat Butch Lindley by a distance of slightly more than a lap.

The majority of the field was driving Buick vehicles while participating in the event. Terry Labonte and Ricky Rudd would dominate the first one hundred laps of this race while Harry Gant would monopolize the closing laps of this race with a 1-lap lead over everyone else. Joe Ruttman would be the lowest finishing driver to complete the race; albeit more than 50 laps behind the only driver on the lead lap, who was Harry Gant. This would be his first victory ever in the NASCAR Cup Series.

Brad Teague's 11th place finish in this race was also the highest finishing position in the Cup series for team owner, Charlie Henderson. Winnings for this event ranged from the winner's share of $26,795 ($ when adjusted for inflation) to the last-place finisher's share of $1,300 ($ when adjusted for inflation). The overall prize purse for this racing event added up to $170,500 ($ when adjusted for inflation).

Qualifying

Top 10 finishers

Standings after the race

References

Virginia National Bank 500
Virginia National Bank 500
NASCAR races at Martinsville Speedway